The Bellingham Mariners were a Minor League Baseball team in the Class A-Short Season Northwest League, based in Bellingham, Washington. The club served as the Seattle Mariners' short-season affiliate from 1977 to 1994.

History
Major League Baseball returned to Seattle in 1977 with the expansion Mariners of the American League. Bellingham signed a player development contract with the Seattle and adopted their parent club's identity, taking the name Mariners. Also referred to as Baby M's, the team would serve as Seattle's only affiliate in their inaugural season. The Northwest League had two divisions, one for teams with affiliations and the other for independents. Bellingham won the affiliate division with a 42–26 record and played the Portland Mavericks for the league championship. In a best of three series, Bellingham and Portland split the first two games. The Baby M's held off the Mavericks by a score of 4–2 in the decisive game to claim the 1977 Northwest League crown. Bobby Floyd earned the league's manager of the year award. The Mariners continued their on-field success with nearly identical records going 41–30 and 41–31 in consecutive seasons.

In 1980, Bellingham amassed a 45-25 en route to a North Division title. The Baby M's faced the Eugene Emeralds in the league championship series, which they split during the first two games. The decisive third game was cancelled due to rain; as a result, the Mariners and Emeralds were named co-champions of the Northwest League. The club witnessed a significant jump in attendance with 42,292 passing through the turnstiles.

Seeking to repeat as league champions the Baby M's claimed the north division. Bellingham faced the Medford A's in the championship series, but were swept in two games. Two seasons later in 1983, with a roster that included future Hall of Famer Edgar Martinez, the Mariners claimed the division title with a 40-28 record. Bellingham was again swept by Medford in the championship series. In 1984 and 1985 the Baby M's posted mirror finishes at 39-35 taking second in the Washington division standings.

In 1987, 17-year-old Ken Griffey Jr. hit his first professional home run while on the road at Everett Memorial Stadium on June 18. A plaque was placed on the sidewalk outside the stadium where the ball landed.

Despite on-field success and a steady stream of Mariners prospects, the club struggled with poor attendance. Following the 1994 season, the Mariners ended their relationship with Bellingham. Seattle moved their affiliation south to Everett were the team assumed a new identity as the Everett AquaSox. Everett, who had been affiliated with the San Francisco Giants swapped with Seattle and moved their short-season affiliation to Bellingham. Bellingham assumed their parent club's moniker to become the Bellingham Giants in 1995. The city government demurred on funding $100,000 in renovations to the team's ballpark amid the affiliation change.

Ballpark
The Bellingham franchise played at Joe Martin Field, a venue with a seating capacity near 1,600. Since 1999, the ballpark serves as the home of the Bellingham Bells of the collegiate summer West Coast League.

Season-by-season record

Hall of Fame alumni

Ken Griffey Jr. (1987) Inducted, 2016
Edgar Martinez (1983) Inducted, 2019

Notable players

Phil Bradley
Iván Calderón
Dave Henderson
Raúl Ibañez
Mark Langston
Derek Lowe
Joe Nathan
Russ Ortiz
Jim Presley
Dave Stewart MLB All-Star
Dave Valle
Omar Vizquel MLB All-Star

See also
Bellingham Mariners players   (1977–1994)

References

Defunct Northwest League teams
Seattle Mariners minor league affiliates
Defunct minor league baseball teams
Defunct baseball teams in Washington (state)
Baseball teams disestablished in 1984
Baseball teams established in 1977